Buck Lake is a lake located in South Frontenac, Ontario, Canada. Its inflows are Milk Lake and various rivers and its outflow is the Mississauga Creek through a dam.

See also 
List of lakes in Ontario

References 

Lakes of Frontenac County